Marco Chiudinelli and Franko Škugor were the defending champions but chose not to defend their title.

Matthew Ebden and Andrew Whittington won the title after defeating Prajnesh Gunneswaran and Saketh Myneni 6–4, 5–7, [10–6] in the final.

Seeds

Draw

References

External links
 Main draw

Santaizi ATP Challenger - Doubles
2018 Doubles